Herbert Norkus (26 July 1916 – 24 January 1932) was a Hitler Youth member who was killed by German Communists. He became a role model and martyr for the Hitler Youth and was widely used in Nazi propaganda, most prominently as the subject of novel and film Hitler Youth Quex.

Background 
Born to a working class family in the Tiergarten district of Berlin, Norkus joined Naval Hitler Youth in 1931. He was reported to have enjoyed playing the piano and drawing. His father had been wounded in World War I, and supposedly had Communist sympathies. The official Nazi biographies of Norkus claimed his father initially opposed his son's Nazi activities but was ultimately converted and became a Nazi too. 

Clashes between the Hitler Youth and the Communist Red Front youth movement (Rote Jungfront) were becoming increasingly common as the NSDAP and the German Communist Party struggled for power in the waning days of the Weimar Republic.

His comrades nicknamed him “Quex” because ”he carried out orders faster than quicksilver”.

Death 

On 24 January 1932, 15-year-old Herbert Norkus and other Hitler Youth members were distributing leaflets advertising a forthcoming Nazi rally. The group was confronted by Communists. Norkus fought them off and ran to a nearby house for help. A man answered and slammed the door in his face. Norkus was then stabbed six times by the pursuing Communists. He banged on another door, which was answered by a woman who tried to get him to a hospital. However, he died on arrival.

"Hitlerjunge Quex" 

Writer Karl Aloys Schenzinger made Norkus into a role model for the Hitler Youth in a popular Nazi novel, Der Hitlerjunge Quex (1932). The novel was required reading for all members of the Hitler Youth. In 1933, it was made into a film directed by Hans Steinhoff, with Hitler Youth member Jürgen Ohlsen in the lead role and Heinrich George in a major role as the boy's father.

Honors 

Passau named a street after Norkus.

A German Navy school ship called the Herbert Norkus was named in his honor, but it was never completed because of the war. Many schools, streets and squares were also named after him during the Nazi period.

See also
Others given posthumous fame by the Nazis 
Wilhelm Gustloff
Horst Wessel
List of Nazis who died in the Beer Hall Putsch

References 
Notes

General reference
 Arnold Littmann: Herbert Norkus und die Hitlerjungen vom Beußelkietz. Berlin: Steuben. 1934.
 Hermann Gerstmayer (Hrsg.): Herbert Norkus, der Hitlerjunge. Berlin: Neues Verlagshaus für Volksliteratur. 1934. 
 Rudolf Ramlow: Herbert Norkus? - hier! Opfer und Sieg der Hitler-Jugend. Stuttgart u. a.: Union Deutsche Verlagsgesellschaft. 1933.
 Wolfgang Schwarz: Kameradschaft Herbert Norkus. Breslau: Handel. 1934.
 Artur Axmann: "Das kann doch nicht das Ende sein." Hitlers letzter Reichsjugendführer erinnert sich. Koblenz: Bublies. 1995. (Norkus gehörte zu Axmanns Gefolgschaft in Berlin) .

External links 
 The History Place - Hitler Youth

1916 births
1932 deaths
People from Mitte
Hitler Youth members
Murdered German children
People murdered in Berlin
Deaths by stabbing in Germany
German anti-communists
1932 murders in Germany
1930s murders in Berlin